OK Bear is the title of the fifth release by Sunny Day Real Estate frontman Jeremy Enigk. The album was recorded outside Barcelona during the year 2008.

Enigk has stated that the title of the album comes from a phrase he accidentally said while stringing together what he thought were nonexistent Spanish words.

The album marks a return to a heavier rock sound of Sunny Day Real Estate.

OK Bear has a relatively stripped-down rock aesthetic compared to the orchestral nature of his previous two solo albums.

Track listing
"Mind Idea" – 2:38
"Late of Camera" – 2:59
"April Storm" – 3:43
"Life's Too Short" – 3:07
"Just a State of Mind" – 3:01
"Sandwich Time" – 3:15
"In a Look" – 3:57
"Same Side Imaginary" – 3:41
"Restart" – 2:40
"Make Believe" – 2:33
"Vale Oso" – 3:18
"Sant Feliu de Guixols" – 3:12

References

External links
Official website

2009 albums
Jeremy Enigk albums